Persian conquest of Egypt may refer to:

First Achaemenid conquest of Egypt at the Battle of Pelusium, resulting in
the Twenty-seventh Dynasty of Egypt (525 BC–404 BC)
Second Achaemenid conquest of Egypt, resulting in
the Thirty-first Dynasty of Egypt (343 BC–332 BC)
Sasanian conquest of Egypt (AD 618–621), resulting in
Sasanian Egypt

See also
 Persian Egypt